The Elan d'or Award for Best Work is an award given at the Elan d'or Awards in Japan. It was first presented in 2001, and was discontinued after 2011. This award is given to the best film and TV drama through the year.

References

External links
 

Awards established in 2001
Japanese film awards
Recurring events established in 2001
2001 establishments in Japan
Lists of films by award